The following is a list of transatlantic flights classified by airline. Some flights may be transatlantic while not being classed as such; for instance SQ21&22 (alongside 23&24) may fly over the Atlantic if wind conditions are preferable, but may fly over Asia or The Arctic Ocean instead.

References

Transatlantic flight
commercial transatlantic flights
Commercial Transatlantic